The 2018 O1 Properties Ladies Cup was a professional tennis tournament played on indoor hard courts. It was the third edition of the tournament and was part of the 2018 ITF Women's Circuit. It took place in Khimki, Russia, on 30 April–5 May 2018.

Singles main draw entrants

Seeds 

 1 Rankings as of 23 April 2018.

Other entrants 
The following players received a wildcard into the singles main draw:
  Anastasia Dețiuc
  Varvara Flink
  Margarita Gasparyan
  Sofya Lansere

The following players received entry from the qualifying draw:
  Angelina Gabueva
  Anastasiya Komardina
  Daria Mishina
  Ekaterina Yashina

Champions

Singles

 Vera Lapko def.  Anastasia Potapova, 6–1, 6–3

Doubles
 
 Olga Doroshina /  Anastasiya Komardina def.  Veronika Pepelyaeva /  Anastasia Tikhonova, 6–1, 6–2

External links 
 Official website
 2018 O1 Properties Ladies Cup at ITFtennis.com

2018 ITF Women's Circuit
2018 in Russian tennis
Tennis tournaments in Russia
Khimki
April 2018 sports events in Russia
May 2018 sports events in Russia